Adel Saleh Al-Ghamdi  is a Saudi businessman and the former Chief Executive Officer of the Saudi Stock Exchange (Tadawul), former Chairman of the Arab Federation of Exchanges.

Background 
He has worked for Riyad Bank Europe, Riyad Bank London, HSBC Saudi Arabia, and Capital Market Authority. He has been on the board of the Tadawul Real Estate Company and is the chairman of the Arab Federation of Exchanges. 

From April 2016 to April 2017,  he was a Group CEO at Alissa Group, a Saudi conglomerate.

He was the Chief Executive of the Saudi Stock Exchange (Tadawul) from August 1, 2013 to November 11, 2015.

References 

Living people
Year of birth missing (living people)
Saudi Arabian businesspeople
Saudi Arabian chief executives
CFA charterholders